The Örebro Concert Hall is a concert hall located in Örebro, Sweden. It was built between 1930 and 1932. The hall can accommodate 723 people. Notable past performers include Budgie and Elvis Costello.

References

External links
Official Website

Concert halls in Sweden
Music venues completed in 1932
Buildings and structures in Örebro
Culture in Örebro
1932 establishments in Sweden